John Wall (born 1990) is an American professional basketball player.

John Wall may also refer to the following people:

Politicians
===American politicians===
John A. Wall (1847–?), Wisconsin state politician
John P. Wall, physician and mayor in Tampa, Florida
John Wall (North Dakota politician) (1943–2014), North Dakota educator and politician

Other politicians
John Wall (MP) (died 1435), English Mayor and MP of Newcastle-upon-Tyne
John Wall (Canadian politician) (1938–2010), Canadian educator and politician

Other people
John Wall (priest and antiquarian) (1588–1666), English priest and antiquarian
John Wall (electronic composer) (born 1950), English electroacoustic composer and improviser
John Wall (inventor) (1932–2018), amateur telescope maker, inventor of Crayford focuser
John Wall (judge) (1930–2008), British solicitor who was the first blind judge to be appointed to the High Court of Justice
John Wall (physician) (1708–1776), English physician
John Wall (priest and martyr) (1620–1679), Catholic martyr and saint
John F. Wall (born 1931), U.S. Army general
John Wall (philosopher) (born 1965) American educator and theoretical ethicist
John Wall, Baron Wall, British businessman and peer

See also

Jack Wall (disambiguation)
John Wall Callcott (1766–1821), composer
John Wall Dance, a dance step